Samuel William Surridge (born 28 July 1998) is an English professional footballer who plays as a forward for  club Nottingham Forest. During his time at AFC Bournemouth, he spent time on loan at Weymouth, Poole Town, Yeovil Town, with whom he made his Football League debut, Oldham Athletic and Swansea City.

Club career

Early career
Surridge was born in Slough, Berkshire, and moved to Ferndown, Dorset, at the age of seven. He joined the AFC Bournemouth academy at the age of 14 from local club Bournemouth Sports.

AFC Bournemouth
Surridge returned to the Cherries academy when he joined the under-15s and was soon offered a scholarship, scoring freely for the club's youth team, before impressing during a productive loan spell with Poole Town during their debut season in National South in 2016/17 season.

League Two Loans and Premier League Debut
On 3 August 2017, Surridge joined League Two club Yeovil Town on loan until the end of the season. Surridge made his Football League debut as a second-half substitute for Yeovil against Luton Town, on 5 August 2017. He scored his first goal for Yeovil in an EFL Trophy tie against Exeter City on 29 August 2017. Surridge finished the season with Yeovil having scored 10 goals in 53 total appearances across all competitions for the club.

On 30 July 2018, Surridge joined League Two club Oldham Athletic on a season-long loan deal. Five goals from four matches in September earned him the League Two Player of the Month award, and by 6 January, he had twelve goals from twenty appearances in all competitions. Surridge scored against Premier League opposition in the Third Round of the FA Cup, scoring a penalty as Oldham came from behind to beat Fulham 2–1. He was then recalled by his parent club in early January.

Surridge made his Premier League debut for the Cherries in a 5–1 loss to Arsenal on 28 February 2019, replacing Ryan Fraser on the 80-minute mark. Surridge was awarded the club award for Under-21 Player of the Year on 14 May 2019, after a fruitful loan spell at Oldham Athletic and making his Premier League debut for the club against Arsenal.

Loan to Swansea City and first-team Breakthrough
On 6 August 2019, Championship club Swansea City signed Surridge on a season-long loan deal. He scored his first Swansea goal in a 3–1 away win at Queens Park Rangers on 21 August 2019 before being recalled on 1 January 2020 by AFC Bournemouth. Surridge finished the season with Swansea having scored 7 goals in 23 total appearances across all competitions for the club.

Surridge signed a new contract with the Cherries in early January 2020, a four-and-a-half-year deal that would keep him with the club until the summer of 2024. He scored his first professional goal for the Cherries in the FA Cup Fourth Round, with a late goal against Arsenal in a 2–1 defeat on 27 January 2020. Surridge was thought to have scored his first Premier League goal for the club, equalising 1–1 in the penultimate game of the 2019–20 season against south coast rivals Southampton. However, it was ruled out by VAR due to teammate Callum Wilson adjudged as being in an offside position. The game finished 2–0 to Southampton. Surridge was described by Cherries coach Mark Molesley as being the perfect example to loan players at non-league clubs in how to make the grade, citing his successes in loan spells at non-league level and football league clubs like Yeovil, Oldham and Swansea as being evidence of Surridge "climbing the ladder and earning his stripes".

Stoke City
On 4 August 2021, Surridge joined Stoke City on a four-year contract for an undisclosed fee. Surridge scored the winning goal on his debut three days later in a home match against Reading. He scored in the first two rounds of the EFL Cup against Fleetwood Town and Doncaster Rovers and in the league against Barnsley. He then failed to find the net in his next 15 appearances and was sent-off against Peterborough United following an altercation with Josh Knight. He was allowed to leave Stoke in the January transfer window just six months after joining by manager Michael O'Neill who stated that Surridge had struggled to settle into the team. “He got off to a decent start, scored on his debut and the early games were very promising but his form suffered a little bit after that and I think generally he struggled to settle at the club. Sometimes that happens".

Nottingham Forest
On 31 January 2022, Surridge joined Nottingham Forest for an undisclosed fee. The transfer fee was reported to be £2.2 million.

International career
On 8 October 2019, Surridge received his first call up to the England U21 squad, and made a goalscoring debut during a 2–2 draw against Slovenia in Maribor on 11 October 2019.

Career statistics

Honours

Nottingham Forest
EFL Championship play-offs: 2022

Individual
EFL League Two Player of the Month: September 2018
AFC Bournemouth Under-21 Player of the Year: 2018–19

References

External links

Profile at the Nottingham Forest F.C. website

1998 births
Living people
People from Ferndown
Footballers from Dorset
Sportspeople from Slough
Footballers from Berkshire
English footballers
Association football forwards
AFC Bournemouth players
Weymouth F.C. players
Poole Town F.C. players
Yeovil Town F.C. players
Oldham Athletic A.F.C. players
Swansea City A.F.C. players
Stoke City F.C. players
Nottingham Forest F.C. players
Southern Football League players
National League (English football) players
English Football League players
Premier League players
England under-21 international footballers